Lophomenia is a genus of cavibelonian solenogasters, shell-less, worm-like, marinemollusks.

References

Cavibelonia